Openly Straight is a 2013 young adult novel and the second book by American author Bill Konigsberg. The coming-of-age story focuses on high school junior Rafe who has been openly gay since he was in the eighth grade. When he switches to a private all boys high school across the country in Massachusetts he decides to hide his sexuality from his new classmates. The novel has been translated into German, Vietnamese, and Portuguese.

Synopsis 
When Rafe switches to a private all boys high school in Natick, he decides to hide the fact that he is gay, hoping to find a new identity as just Rafe and not just ‘that gay kid’. In an attempt to live a life without labels, Rafe is immediately taken in by the jocks for his soccer abilities. Rafe relishes in being allowed to be a jock and being treated normally in the locker room. Rafe finds a best friend and potential boyfriend called Ben. However, Ben is straight and has no idea about Rafe being gay.

Awards and nominations
The novel won the Sid Fleischman Award for Humor in 2014 and was a finalist for the Amelia Elizabeth Walden Award. It also made YALSA's Best Fiction for Young Adults list for 2014; the American Library Association Rainbow List; The Texas Library Association's Tayshas List (as a top ten title); and was nominated for the Georgia Peach Award.

Sequel 
In March 2016, Konigsberg released the sequel Honestly Ben, which features Ben as the protagonist. It received three starred reviews: from Publishers Weekly, Booklist, and School Library Journal. Both novels in the series were released as audio books that month, too.

References 

2013 American novels
2013 LGBT-related literary works
American young adult novels
American LGBT novels
Gay male teen fiction
American bildungsromans
2010s LGBT novels
Novels set in high schools and secondary schools
LGBT-related young adult novels
Novels set in Massachusetts
Arthur A. Levine Books books